John W. Etty is an English former professional rugby league footballer who played between 1944 and 1961.

Background
John Etty was born in Batley, West Riding of Yorkshire, England and his birth was registered in Dewsbury, West Riding of Yorkshire, England.

He was a pupil at Batley Grammar School between 1937 and 1943.

Playing career

International honours
John Etty was a representative for the British Empire XIII while at Batley against Wales XIII on 19 May 1951, and was an England "reserve to travel" while at Batley against France on Saturday 17 May 1947.

County honours
John Etty was selected for Yorkshire County XIII whilst at Batley during the 1947/48, 1948/49 and 1949/50 seasons.

Championship final appearances
John Etty played , i.e. number 5, in Oldham's 15–14 victory over Hull F.C. in the Championship Final during the 1956–57 season at Odsal Stadium, Bradford, and played  in Wakefield Trinity's 3–27 defeat by Wigan in the Championship Final during the 1959–60 season at Odsal Stadium, Bradford on Saturday 21 May 1960.

County League appearances
John Etty played in Oldham's victories in the Lancashire County League during the 1956–57 season and 1957–58 season, and played in Wakefield Trinity's victory in the Yorkshire County League during the 1958–59 season and 1959–60 season.

Challenge Cup Final appearances
John Etty played , i.e. number 5, in Wakefield Trinity's 38–5 victory over Hull F.C. in the 1959–60 Challenge Cup Final during the 1959–60 season at Wembley Stadium, London on 14 May 1960.

County Cup Final appearances
John Etty played , i.e. number 5, and scored a try in Batley's 8–18 defeat by Huddersfield in the 1952 Yorkshire County Cup Final during the 1952–53 season at Headingley Rugby Stadium, Leeds on Saturday 15 November 1952, he played , i.e. number 2, and scored a try in Oldham's 10–3 victory over St. Helens in the 1956 Lancashire County Cup Final during the 1956–57 season at Central Park, Wigan on Saturday 20 October 1956, he played  in the 13–8 victory over Wigan in the 1956 Lancashire County Cup Final during the 1957–58 season at Station Road, Swinton on Saturday 19 October 1957, and he played , and scored a try in Wakefield Trinity's 16–10 victory over Huddersfield in the 1960 Yorkshire County Cup Final during the 1960–61 season at Headingley Rugby Stadium, Leeds on Saturday 29 October 1960.

Club career
John Etty made his début for Batley during 1944, he was transferred from Batley to Oldham during January 1955, he was transferred from Oldham to Wakefield Trinity, he made his début for Wakefield Trinity during April 1959, he played his last match for Wakefield Trinity during the 1960–61 season, and he appears to have scored no drop-goals (or field-goals as they are currently known in Australasia), but prior to the 1974–75 season all goals, whether; conversions, penalties, or drop-goals, scored 2-points, consequently prior to this date drop-goals were often not explicitly documented, therefore '0' drop-goals may indicate drop-goals not recorded, rather than no drop-goals scored. In addition, prior to the 1949–50 season, the archaic field-goal was also still a valid means of scoring points.

All Six Cups
Only five rugby league footballers have won "All Six Cups" during their career, they are; Aubrey Casewell (while at Salford and Leeds), Alan Edwards (while at Salford and Bradford Northern), John Etty (while at Oldham and Wakefield Trinity), Edward "Ted" Slevin (while at Wigan and Huddersfield), and Derek Turner (while at Oldham and Wakefield Trinity). "All Six Cups" comprises the Challenge Cup, Rugby Football League Championship, Lancashire County Cup, Lancashire League, Yorkshire County Cup and Yorkshire League.

Honoured at Batley and Oldham
John Etty was invited by the Batley RLFC board of directors to officially open the Heritage Stand at Mount Pleasant, Batley on Sunday 12 August 1990, he was also bestowed with an Honorary Life Membership of Batley RLFC on the same day, and he is an Oldham Hall of Fame Inductee.

References

External links
Search for "Etty" at rugbyleagueproject.org
Bevin Boys badge for former RL star
Batley Grammar School Batelians' Association
Oldham Hall of Fame
Statistics at orl-heritagetrust.org.uk
Rugby League Cup Final 1960
Search for "John Etty" at britishnewspaperarchive.co.uk
Search for "Jack Etty" at britishnewspaperarchive.co.uk

1927 births
Living people
Batley Bulldogs players
Bevin Boys
British Empire rugby league team players
English rugby league players
Oldham R.L.F.C. players
Rugby league centres
Rugby league players from Batley
Rugby league wingers
Wakefield Trinity players
Yorkshire rugby league team players